Michael James Stephens (born  1 November 1967 in Auckland) is a former New Zealand cricketer who played for the Auckland Aces and the Northern Districts Knights in the 1990s and he also played for Counties-Manukau in the Hawke Cup. Nowdadys he works for St Joseph's School in Pukekohe.

See also
 List of Auckland representative cricketers

References

1967 births
Living people
New Zealand cricketers
Auckland cricketers
Northern Districts cricketers